Carl Bessai (born 1966 in Edmonton, Alberta) is a Canadian film director and screenwriter. Bessai studied at OCAD University and at York University in Toronto graduating with a Master of Fine Arts Degree. He got his start directing documentary films before moving to Vancouver and directing his debut feature film Johnny in 1999.

Bessai was nominated for the Genie Award for Best Director at the 29th Genie Awards for his 2007 film Normal, which was also a nominee for Best Motion Picture.

He is a member of the Directors Guild of Canada, the Writers Guild of Canada, and the Canadian Film and Television Producers Association.

Selected filmography
Johnny (1999)
Lola (2001)
Emile (2003)
Severed: Forest of the Dead (2005)
Unnatural & Accidental (2006)
Normal (2007)
Mothers & Daughters (2008)
Cole (2009)
Repeaters (2010)
Fathers & Sons (2010)
Sisters & Brothers (2011)
No Clue (2013)
Rehearsal (2015)
The Lears (2017)
In Her City (2020)
Evelyne (2021)

References

External links

1966 births
Living people
Canadian cinematographers
Film producers from Alberta
Canadian male screenwriters
Film directors from Edmonton
Writers from Edmonton
21st-century Canadian screenwriters